The Seattle Mariners 1998 season was their 22nd season, and was the final year in which Kingdome was the home venue for the entire season.

The Mariners were the defending division champions, but exceeded the .500 mark only once during the season; at  after a win at Detroit on  On July 18 at the Kingdome, Seattle (crimson, silver, and black) and the Kansas City Royals (yellow gold and blue) played a game in futuristic uniforms for "Turn Ahead the Clock" night. Shortstop Alex Rodriguez hit a three-run homer in the seventh inning and the Mariners won  

Ken Griffey Jr. hit 56 home runs to tie his franchise record set the year before; Rodriguez hit 42 home runs and stole 46 bases to become the third member of the 40/40 club, joining Jose Canseco (1988) and Barry Bonds

Offseason
November 13, 1997: Jalal Leach was signed as a free agent with the Seattle Mariners.
December 3, 1997: Ken Huckaby was signed as a free agent with the Seattle Mariners.
December 16, 1997: Pat Listach was signed as a free agent with the Seattle Mariners.
December 27, 1997: Rico Rossy was signed as a free agent with the Seattle Mariners.
January 8, 1998: Glenallen Hill signed as a free agent with the Seattle Mariners.
January 29, 1998: Jalal Leach was traded by the Seattle Mariners with Scott Smith (minors) to the San Francisco Giants for David McCarty.

Regular season

Season standings

Record vs. opponents

Opening Day starters
Jay Buhner
Joey Cora
Russ Davis
Ken Griffey Jr.
Glenallen Hill
Randy Johnson
Edgar Martínez
Alex Rodriguez
David Segui
Dan Wilson

Notable transactions
June 13, 1998: Catcher Ken Huckaby was released by the Mariners.
July 6, 1998: Outfielder Glenallen Hill was selected off waivers by the Chicago Cubs from the Mariners.
July 31, 1998: Randy Johnson was traded by the Mariners to the Houston Astros for pitcher Freddy García, infielder Carlos Guillen, and a player to be named later; Houston sent pitcher John Halama to the Mariners on October 1 to complete the trade.
August 31, 1998: Infielder David Bell was traded by the Cleveland Indians to the Mariners for Joey Cora.

Roster

Major League debuts
Batters:
Rickey Cradle (Jul 1)
Charles Gipson (Mar 31)
Carlos Guillén (Sep 6)
Shane Monahan (Jul 9)
Ryan Radmanovich (Apr 13)
Pitchers:
Steve Gajkowski (May 25)
David Holdridge (Aug 8)

Game log

|- align="center"
| 1 || March 31||Cleveland Indians || 9-10|| Mesa (1-0)|| Fossas (0-1)|| Jackson (1)||57,822 ||0-1
|-

|- align="center"
| 2 ||April 1 ||Cleveland Indians || 7-9|| Wright (1-0)|| Moyer (0-1)||Jackson (2) || 24,523 || 0-2
|- align="center" bgcolor="bbffbb"
| 3 ||April 3 ||Boston Red Sox ||11-6 || Cloude (1-0) || Lowe (0-1) || || 27,555 ||1-2
|- align="center" bgcolor="bbffbb"
| 4 ||April 4 || Boston Red Sox||12-6 || Swift (1-0) || Rose (0-1) || || 43,035 ||2-2
|- align="center"
| 5 ||April 5 ||Boston Red Sox ||5-10 || Saberhagen (1-0) || Johnson (0-1) || || 35,143 ||2-3
|- align="center" bgcolor="bbffbb"
| 6 ||April 6 ||New York Yankees||8-0 || Moyer (1-1) || Pettitte (0-2) || || 27,445 ||3-3
|- align="center"
| 7 ||April 7 ||New York Yankees|| 7-13 || Wells (1-1) || Bullinger (0-1)  || || 28,424 ||3-4
|- align="center"
| 8 || April 8||New York Yankees || 3-4|| Lloyd (1-0) || Ayala (0-1) || Stanton (1) || 33,922 ||3-5
|- align="center"
| 9 ||April 10 ||@ Boston Red Sox || 7-9|| Garces (1-0) || Timlin (0-1) || || 32,805 ||3-6
|- align="center"
| 10 ||April 11 ||@ Boston Red Sox ||0-5 || Martinez (2-0) || Moyer (1-2) || || 32,403 ||3-7
|- align="center"
| 11 ||April 12 ||@ Boston Red Sox ||7-8 || Wasdin (2-0) || Slocumb (0-1) || || 23,270 ||3-8
|- align="center"
| 12 ||April 13 ||@ Cleveland Indians || 5-6|| Burba (2-1) || Cloude (1-1) || Jackson (6) || 42,793 ||3-9
|- align="center"
| 13 ||April 14 ||@ Cleveland Indians ||3-8 || Assenmacher (1-0) || Slocumb (0-2) || || 40,490 ||3-10
|- align="center" bgcolor="bbffbb"
| 14 ||April 15 ||@ Cleveland Indians ||5-3  || Spoljaric (1-0) || Assenmacher (1-1) || Ayala (1) || 40,527 ||4-10
|- align="center" bgcolor="bbffbb"
| 15 ||April 16 ||@ Minnesota Twins ||3-2 || Timlin (1-0) || Aguliera (0-2) || Ayala (2) || 11,351 ||5-10
|- align="center" bgcolor="bbffbb"
| 16 ||April 17 ||@ Minnesota Twins ||11-6 || Fassero (1-0) || Milton (2-1) || || 18,169 ||6-10
|- align="center" bgcolor="bbffbb"
| 17 ||April 18 ||@ Minnesota Twins ||5-3 || Cloude (2-1) || Tewksbury (2-2) || Ayala (3) || 23,943 ||7-10
|- align="center" bgcolor="bbffbb"
| 18 ||April 19 || @ Minnesota Twins ||7-4 || Swift (2-0) || Hawkins (0-2) || Timlin (1) || 15,124 ||8-10
|- align="center" bgcolor="bbffbb"
| 19 ||April 20 ||Kansas City Royals ||8-7 || Lira (1-0) || Rios (0-1) || Ayala (4) || 38,345 ||9-10
|- align="center"
| 20 ||April 21 || Kansas City Royals ||3-5 || Bevil (3-0) || Fossas (0-2) || Montgomery (4) || 21,547 ||9-11
|- align="center" bgcolor="bbffbb"
| 21 ||April 22 || Kansas City Royals ||11-5 || Fassero (2-0) || Pichardo (0-2) || || 22,698 ||10-11
|- align="center" bgcolor="bbffbb"
| 22 ||April 24 || Minnesota Twins ||4-2 || Cloude (3-1) || Tewksbury (2-3) || Ayala (5) || 28,157 ||11-11
|- align="center"
| 23 ||April 25 || Minnesota Twins ||2-8 || Aguliera (1-2) || Timlin (1-2) || || 51,880 ||11-12
|- align="center"
| 24 ||April 26 || Minnesota Twins || 0-2|| Radke (3-1) || Moyer (1-3) || Aguilera (4) || 31,732 ||11-13
|- align="center" bgcolor="bbffbb"
| 25 ||April 28 || @ Kansas City Royals||5-1 || Johnson (1-1) || Service (1-1) || || 11,630 ||12-13
|- align="center"
| 26 ||April 29||@ New York Yankees ||5-8 || Cone (3-1) || Fassero (2-1) || Rivera (3) || 27,949 ||12-14
|- align="center"
| 27 ||April 30||@ New York Yankees ||8-9 || Rivera (1-0) || Ayala (0-2) || || 28,517 ||12-15
|-

|- align="center"
| 28 ||May 1 || Detroit Tigers || 3-17|| Worrell (2-3) || Swift (2-1) || || 28,827 ||12-16
|- align="center" bgcolor="bbffbb"
| 29 ||May 2 || Detroit Tigers || 4-0|| Moyer (2-3) || Thompson (1-4) || || 48,630 ||13-16
|- align="center" bgcolor="bbffbb"
| 30 ||May 3 || Detroit Tigers ||10-6 || Johnson (2-1) || Castillo (0-1) || || 44,488 ||14-16
|- align="center" bgcolor="bbffbb"
| 31 ||May 5 || Chicago White Sox||8-1 || Fassero (3-1) || Eyre (1-4) || || 22,760 ||15-16
|- align="center" bgcolor="bbffbb"
| 32 ||May 6 || Chicago White Sox ||10-9 || Slocumb (1-2) || Castillo (0-2) || Ayala (6) || 21,243 ||16-16
|- align="center"
| 33 ||May 7 ||Toronto Blue Jays ||0-6 || Clemens (4-3) || Moyer (2-4) || || 24,129 ||16-17
|- align="center" bgcolor="bbffbb"
| 34 ||May 8 || Toronto Blue Jays ||8-3 || Johnson (3-1) || Williams (3-2) || || 29,920 ||17-17
|- align="center"
| 35 ||May 9 ||Toronto Blue Jays ||1-4 || Hentgen (4-3) || Swift (2-2) || Myers (9) || 49,851 ||17-18
|- align="center" bgcolor="bbffbb"
| 36 ||May 10||Toronto Blue Jays || 3-1|| Fassero (4-1) || Guzman (1-5) || Ayala (7) || 39,249 ||18-18
|- align="center" bgcolor="bbffbb"
| 37 ||May 12 ||@ Detroit Tigers ||4-2 || Spoljaric (2-0) || Thompson (2-5) || Ayala (8) || 11,659 ||19-18
|- align="center"
| 38 ||May 13 ||@ Detroit Tigers ||5-8 || Moehler (3-3) || Cloude (3-2) || Jones (5) || 10,766 ||19-19
|- align="center"
| 39 ||May 14 ||@ Chicago White Sox ||3-5 || Fordham (1-0) || Johnson (3-2) || Simas (2) || 15,007 ||19-20
|- align="center"
| 40 ||May 15 || @ Chicago White Sox ||3-6 || Navarro (4-3) || Swift (2-3) || Foulke (1) || 16,127 ||19-21
|- align="center" bgcolor="bbffbb"
| 41 ||May 16 || @ Toronto Blue Jays ||8-1 || Fassero (5-1) || Guzman (1-6) || || 31,121 ||20-21
|- align="center"
| 42 ||May 17 ||@ Toronto Blue Jays ||3-4 || Plesac (2-2) || Slocumb (1-3) || || 28,111 ||20-22
|- align="center" bgcolor="bbffbb"
| 43 ||May 18 ||@ Toronto Blue Jays ||9-4 || Spoljaric (3-0) || Clemens (4-5) || || 28,125 ||21-22
|- align="center"
| 44 || May 19 ||@ Texas Rangers ||4-10 || Helling (7-1) || Johnson (3-3) || Hernandez (1) || 37,258 ||21-23
|- align="center"
| 45 || May 20 ||@ Texas Rangers || 7-8 || Crabtree (1-0) || Timlin (1-3) || Wetteland (13) || 29,454 ||21-24
|- align="center"
| 46 || May 21 ||@ Texas Rangers || 8-9 || Bailes (1-0) || Ayala (0-3) || || 34,613 || 21-25
|- align="center" 
| 47 || May 22 || Tampa Bay Devil Rays || 2-5 || Johnson (2-1) || Moyer (2-5) || Hernandez (8) || 29,522 || 21-26
|- align="center"
| 48 || May 23 || Tampa Bay Devil Rays || 3-6 || Yan (4-0) || Ayala (0-4) || Hernandez (9) || 35,819 || 21-27
|- align="center" bgcolor="bbffbb"
| 49 || May 24 || Tampa Bay Devil Rays || 3-1 || Johnson (4-3) || Springer (1-8) || || 46,867 || 22-27
|- align="center" bgcolor="bbffbb"
| 50 || May 25 || Baltimore Orioles|| 12-4 || Swift (3-3) || Rodriguez (0-2) || || 28,375 || 23-27
|- align="center"
| 51 || May 26|| Baltimore Orioles || 3-8 || Erickson (5-5) || Fassero (5-2) || || 31,164 || 23-28
|- align="center" bgcolor="bbffbb"
| 52 || May 28 ||@ Tampa Bay Devil Rays || 5-2 || Moyer (3-5) || Johnson (2-2) || || 27,017 || 24-28
|- align="center" bgcolor="bbffbb"
| 53 || May 29 ||@ Tampa Bay Devil Rays || 6-2 || Johnson (5-3) || Saunders (1-5) || || 32,142 ||25-28
|- align="center"
| 54 || May 30 ||@ Tampa Bay Devil Rays || 2-5 || Springer (2-8) || Cloude (3-3) || Hernandez (10) || 40,212 ||25-29
|- align="center" bgcolor="bbffbb"
| 55 || May 31 ||@ Tampa Bay Devil Rays || 11-6 || Swift (4-3) || White (0-1) || || 35,184 ||26-29
|-

|- align="center"
| 56 ||June 1 ||@ Baltimore Orioles || 9-10 || Mills (1-2) || Fossas (0-3) || Benitez (8) || 42,622 ||26-30
|- align="center"
| 57 || June 2 ||@ Baltimore Orioles || 8-9 || Charlton (1-1) || Ayala (0-5) || || 46,724 ||26-31
|- align="center"
| 58 || June 3 ||Anaheim Angels || 1-8 || Finley (6-2) || Johnson (5-4) || || 24,944 ||26-32
|- align="center"
| 59 || June 4 ||Anaheim Angels || 2-6 || Hill (8-4) || Cloude (3-4) || Hasegawa (1) || 23,709 ||26-33
|- align="center" bgcolor="bbffbb"
| 60 || June 5 ||Los Angeles Dodgers|| 4-0 || Swift (5-3) || Valdez (4-7) || || 39,053 ||27-33
|- align="center"
| 61 || June  6||Los Angeles Dodgers || 6-10 || Bruske (3-0) || Wells (0-1) || Osuna (2) || 49,559 ||27-34
|- align="center"
| 62 || June 7 ||Los Angeles Dodgers || 4-7 || Dreifort (4-5) || Moyer (3-6) || Osuna (3) || 41,514 ||27-35
|- align="center"
| 63 || June 8 ||@ San Francisco Giants || 3-4 || Darwin (6-3) || Johnson (5-5) || Rodriguez (1) || 34,166 ||27-36
|- align="center"
| 64 || June 9 ||@ San Francisco Giants || 6-7 || Johnstone (2-2) || Cloude (3-5) || Nen (19) || 24,137 ||27-37
|- align="center" bgcolor="bbffbb"
| 65 || June 10 ||@ San Francisco Giants || 4-1 || Swift (6-3) || Hershiser (6-4) || Slocumb (1) || 23,590 ||28-37
|- align="center"
| 66 || June 11 ||@ Oakland Athletics ||2-5 || Oquist (4-3) || Fassero (5-3) || Taylor (11) || 7,838 ||28-38
|- align="center" bgcolor="bbffbb"
| 67 || June 12 ||@ Oakland Athletics ||5-0 || Moyer (4-6) || Candiotti (4-8) || || 11,533 ||29-38
|- align="center"
| 68 || June 13 ||@ Oakland Athletics ||3-7 || Stein (3-3) || Johnson (5-6) || Fetters (3) || 21,444 ||29-39
|- align="center"
| 69 || June 14 ||@ Oakland Athletics ||3-4 || Taylor (2-5) || Slocumb (1-4) || || 21,503 ||29-40
|- align="center"
| 70 || June 16 ||@ Anaheim Angels || 2-3 || Dickson (7-4) || Swift (6-4) || Percival (21) || 23,123 || 29-41
|- align="center"
| 71 || June 17 ||@ Anaheim Angels || 2-4 || Olivares (5-2) || Fassero (5-4) || Percival (22) || 24,800 || 29-42
|- align="center"
| 72 || June 18 ||@ Anaheim Angels || 5-11 || Washburn (3-0) || Spoljaric (3-1) || DeLucia (1) || 30,268 || 29-43
|- align="center" bgcolor="bbffbb"
| 73 || June 19 || Oakland Athletics || 9-1 || Johnson (6-6) || Stein (3-4) || || 33,212 || 30-43
|- align="center"
| 74 || June 20 || Oakland Athletics || 2-6 || Haynes (5-3) || Cloude (3-6) || || 44,597 || 30-44
|- align="center" bgcolor="bbffbb"
| 75 || June 21 || Oakland Athletics || 10-5 || Swift (7-4) || Oquist (4-4) || || 37,665 || 31-44
|- align="center"
| 76 || June 22 || San Diego Padres || 3-5 || Miceli (7-2) || Fassero (5-5) || Hoffman (23) || 41,571 || 31-45
|- align="center" bgcolor="bbffbb"
| 77 || June 23 || San Diego Padres || 5-3 || Moyer (5-6) || Hamilton (5-8) || Slocumb (2) || 30,961 || 32-45
|- align="center" bgcolor="bbffbb"
| 78 || June 24 || @ San Diego Padres || 2-1 || Johnson (7-6) || Ashby (10-5) || || 36,900 || 33-45
|- align="center"
| 79 || June 25 || @ San Diego Padres || 0-6 || Langston (2-1) || Cloude (3-7) || Wall (1) || 32,626 || 33-46
|- align="center"
| 80 || June 26 || @ Arizona Diamondbacks || 8-13 || Sodowsky (2-4) || Spoljaric (3-2) || || 49,328 || 33-47
|- align="center" bgcolor="bbffbb"
| 81 || June 27 || @ Arizona Diamondbacks || 6-4 || Fassero (6-5) || Benes (6-8) || Slocumb (3) || 48,488 || 34-47
|- align="center"
| 82 || June 28 || @ Arizona Diamondbacks || 2-3 || Embree (2-0) || Ayala (0-6) || || 47,968 || 34-48
|- align="center"
| 83 || June 30|| Colorado Rockies || 4-6 || Astacio (6-8) || Johnson (7-7) || Munoz (1) || 28,821 || 34-49
|-

|- align="center" bgcolor="bbffbb"
| 84 || July 1|| Colorado Rockies || 9-5 || Cloude (4-7) || Saipe (0-1) || || 25,551 || 35-49
|- align="center" bgcolor="bbffbb"
| 85 || July 2|| Colorado Rockies || 10-3 || Swift (8-4) || Kile (5-11) || || 32,523 || 36-49
|- align="center" bgcolor="bbffbb"
| 86 || July 3 || @ Texas Rangers || 8-2 || Fassero (7-5) || Burkett (4-9) || || 45,233 || 37-49
|- align="center"
| 87 || July  4|| @ Texas Rangers || 2-9 || Sele (12-5) || Moyer (5-7) || || 46,067 || 37-50
|- align="center"
| 88 || July 5 || @ Texas Rangers || 4-8 || Hernandez (3-1) || Johnson (7-8) || || 38,053 || 37-51
|- align="center" bgcolor="bbffbb"
| 89 || July 9 || Anaheim Angels || 8-6 || Fassero (8-5) || Olivares (5-5) || Timlin (2) || 24,210 || 38-51
|- align="center"
| 90 || July 10 || Anaheim Angels || 3-5 || Percival (2-3) || Ayala (0-7) || || 28,869 || 38-52
|- align="center" bgcolor="bbffbb"
| 91 || July 11 || Anaheim Angels || 2-0 || Johnson (8-8) || Sparks (3-1) || || 35,788 || 39-52
|- align="center"
| 92 || July 12 || Anaheim Angels || 5-8 || Dickson (9-6) || Swift (8-5) || Percival (26) || 32,797 || 39-53
|- align="center" bgcolor="bbffbb"
| 93 || July 13 || Texas Rangers || 10-3 || Cloude (5-7) || Van Poppel (1-2) || || 25,170 || 40-53
|- align="center" bgcolor="bbffbb"
| 94 || July 14 || Texas Rangers || 6-3 || Fassero (9-5) || Burkett (5-10) || Timlin (3) || 25,545 || 41-53
|- align="center" bgcolor="bbffbb"
| 95 || July 15 || Minnesota Twins || 4-1 || Moyer (6-7) || Hawkins (5-9) || Timlin (4) || 23,250 || 42-53
|- align="center" bgcolor="bbffbb"
| 96 || July 16 || Minnesota Twins || 3-0 || Johnson (9-8) || Radke (9-8) || || 24,974 || 43-53
|- align="center" bgcolor="bbffbb"
| 97 || July 17 || Kansas City Royals || 18-5 || Swift (9-5) || Rusch (6-11) || || 29,500 || 44-53
|- align="center" bgcolor="bbffbb"
| 98 || July 18 || Kansas City Royals || 8-5 || Ayala (1-7) || Service (3-2) || || 42,633 || 45-53
|- align="center"
| 99 || July 19 || Kansas City Royals || 1-4 || Belcher (9-8) || Fassero (9-6) || Montgomery (22) || 30,851 || 45-54
|- align="center" bgcolor="bbffbb"
| 100 || July 21 || @ Tampa Bay Devil Rays || 8-3 || Moyer (7-7) || Alvarez (4-8) || || 30,298 || 46-54
|- align="center"
| 101 || July 22 || @ Tampa Bay Devil Rays || 5-7 || Lopez (6-2) || Johnson (9-9) || Hernandez (18) || 31,558 || 46-55
|- align="center"
| 102 || July 24 || @ Baltimore Orioles || 4-7 || Mussina (8-5) || Swift (9-6) || Benitez (13) || 48,184 || 46-56
|- align="center" bgcolor="bbffbb"
| 103 || July 25 || @ Baltimore Orioles || 4-2 || Fassero (10-6) || Kamieniecki (2-3) || Timlin (5) || 48,365 || 47-56
|- align="center" bgcolor="bbffbb"
| 104 || July 26 || @ Baltimore Orioles || 10-4 || Moyer (8-7) || Erickson (11-8) || || 48,199 || 48-56
|- align="center"
| 105 || July 28 || Cleveland Indians || 3-4 || Nagy (9-6) || Johnson (9-10) || Jackson (26) || 31,124 || 48-57
|- align="center"
| 106 || July 29 || Cleveland Indians || 7-8 || Ogea (4-2) || McCarthy (0-1) || Jackson (27) || 25,953 || 48-58
|- align="center"
| 107 || July 30 || Cleveland Indians || 8-9 || Shuey (3-1) || Wells (0-2) || || 31,081 || 48-59
|- align="center"
| 108 || July 31 || New York Yankees || 3-5 || Irabu (10-4) || Fassero (10-7) || Rivera (29) || 43,837 || 48-60
|-

|- align="center"
| 109 || August 1 || New York Yankees || 2-5 || Wells (13-2) || Moyer (8-8) || || 53,840 || 48-61
|- align="center" bgcolor="bbffbb"
| 110 || August 2 || New York Yankees || 6-3 || Wells (1-2) || Cone (15-4) || Timlin (6) || 47,872 || 49-61
|- align="center" bgcolor="bbffbb"
| 111 || August 3 || Boston Red Sox|| 3-1 || Cloude (6-7) || Wasdin (5-4) || Timlin (7) || 27,887 || 50-61
|- align="center"
| 112 || August 4 || Boston Red Sox || 1-2 || Avery (8-4) || McCarthy (0-2) || Gordon (32) || 29,621 || 50-62
|- align="center" bgcolor="bbffbb"
| 113 || August 7 || @ Detroit Tigers || 6-3 || Slocumb (2-4) || Crow (1-1) || Timlin (8) || DH || 51-62
|- align="center" bgcolor="bbffbb"
| 114 || August 7 || @ Detroit Tigers || 7-1 || Moyer (9-8) || Moehler (12-8) || || 29,039 || 52-62
|- align="center" bgcolor="bbffbb"
| 115 || August 8 || @ Detroit Tigers || 9-3 || Cloude (7-7) || Powell (2-3) || || 37,495 || 53-62
|- align="center" bgcolor="bbffbb"
| 116 || August 9 || @ Detroit Tigers || 6-3 || Wells (2-2) || Runyan (1-3) || Timlin (9) || 27,987 || 54-62
|- align="center"
| 117 || August 11 || @ Toronto Blue Jays || 4-7 || Carpenter (7-6) || Fassero (10-8) || Quantrill (3) || 33,137 || 54-63
|- align="center"
| 118 || August 12 || @ Toronto Blue Jays || 5-11 || Rodriguez (2-3) || Ayala (1-8) || || 39,139 || 54-64
|- align="center"
| 119 || August 14 || @ Chicago White Sox || 2-14 || Sirotka (12-10) || Cloude (7-8) || || 22,713 || 54-65
|- align="center" bgcolor="bbffbb"
| 120 || August 15 || @ Chicago White Sox || 13-7 || Swift (10-6) || Navarro (8-14) || || 21,537 || 55-65
|- align="center"
| 121 || August 16 || @ Chicago White Sox || 3-5 || Foulke (3-1) || Fassero (10-9) || Simas (15) || 25,471 || 55-66
|- align="center" bgcolor="bbffbb"
| 122 || August 17 || Detroit Tigers || 3-1 || Moyer (10-8) || Moehler (12-9) || Timlin (10) || 38,639 || 56-66
|- align="center"
| 123 || August 18 || Detroit Tigers || 6-7 || Greisinger (2-7) || Ayala (1-9) || Jones (21) || 24,136 || 56-67
|- align="center"
| 124 || August 19 || Toronto Blue Jays || 2-16 || Hentgen (11-9) || Cloude (7-9) || Stieb (1) || 26,258 || 56-68
|- align="center"
| 125 || August 20 || Toronto Blue Jays || 0-7 || Clemens (15-6) || Swift (10-7) || || 26,642 || 56-69
|- align="center" bgcolor="bbffbb"
| 126 || August 21 || Chicago White Sox || 5-4 || Paniagua (1-0) || Foulke (3-2) || Timlin (11) || 34,421 || 57-69
|- align="center" bgcolor="bbffbb"
| 127 || August 22 || Chicago White Sox || 5-4 || Timlin (2-3) || Navarro (8-15) || || 43,596 || 58-69
|- align="center" bgcolor="bbffbb"
| 128 || August 23 || Chicago White Sox || 3-2 || Spoljaric (4-2) || Snyder (4-2) || Paniagua (1) || 35,159 || 59-69
|- align="center" bgcolor="bbffbb"
| 129 || August 24 || Chicago White Sox || 11-10 || Cloude (8-9) || Sirotka (12-12) || Timlin (12) || 27,087 || 60-69
|- align="center"
| 130 || August 25 || @ Cleveland Indians || 4-10 || Nagy (11-9) || Swift (10-8) || || 43,113 || 60-70
|- align="center"
| 131 || August 26 || @ Cleveland Indians || 3-5 || Burba (11-9) || Fassero (10-10) || Jackson (33) || 43,091 || 60-71
|- align="center" bgcolor="bbffbb"
| 132 || August 27 || @ Cleveland Indians || 10-4 || Moyer (11-8) || Wright (11-8) || || 43,142 || 61-71
|- align="center"
| 133 || August 28 || @ New York Yankees || 3-10 || Hernandez (10-4) || Spoljaric (4-3) || || 49,789 || 61-72
|- align="center"
| 134 || August 29 || @ New York Yankees || 6-11 || Pettitte (15-8) || Cloude (8-10) || || 55,146 || 61-73
|- align="center" bgcolor="bbffbb"
| 135 || August 30 || @ New York Yankees || 13-3 || Swift (11-8) || Irabu (11-7) || || 55,341 || 62-73
|- align="center"
| 136 || August 31 || @ Boston Red Sox || 1-5 || Saberhagen (12-6) || Fassero (10-11) || || 28,553 || 62-74
|-

|- align="center" bgcolor="bbffbb"
| 137 ||September 1 || @ Boston Red Sox || 7-3 || Moyer (12-8) || Lowe (3-8) || || 28,150 || 63-74
|- align="center"
| 138 ||September 2 || @ Boston Red Sox || 3-7 || Gordon (7-3) || Ayala (1-10) || || 25,813 || 63-75
|- align="center"
| 139 ||September 4 || Baltimore Orioles || 1-10 || Guzman (9-14) || Spoljaric (4-4) || || 27,404 || 63-76
|- align="center" bgcolor="bbffbb"
| 140 ||September 5 || Baltimore Orioles || 6-5 || McCarthy (1-2) || Benitez (5-4) || Timlin (13) || 43,831 || 64-76
|- align="center"
| 141 ||September 6 || Baltimore Orioles || 2-5 || Mussina (13-8) || Fassero (10-12) || Rhodes (4) || 30,285 || 64-77
|- align="center" bgcolor="bbffbb"
| 142 ||September 7 || Baltimore Orioles || 11-1 || Moyer (13-8) || Drabek (6-11) || || 24,229 || 65-77
|- align="center"
| 143 ||September 8 || Tampa Bay Devil Rays || 0-10 || Alvarez (6-13) || Suzuki (0-1) || || 20,679 || 65-78
|- align="center" bgcolor="bbffbb"
| 144 ||September 9 || Tampa Bay Devil Rays || 5-2 || Abbott (1-0) || Arrojo (13-12) || Timlin (14) || 22,256 || 66-78
|- align="center" bgcolor="bbffbb"
| 145 ||September 11 || @ Kansas City Royals || 6-3 || Fassero (11-12) || Barber (2-3) || Timlin (15) || DH || 67-78
|- align="center"
| 146 ||September 11 || @ Kansas City Royals || 5-8 || Appier (1-0) || Swift (11-9) || Rusch (1) || 18,874 || 67-79
|- align="center"
| 147 ||September 12 || @ Kansas City Royals || 2-5 || Belcher (13-12) || Moyer (13-9) || Montgomery (33) || 28,091 || 67-80
|- align="center" bgcolor="bbffbb"
| 148 ||September 14 || @ Minnesota Twins || 10-3 || Suzuki (1-1) || Radke (11-14) || || 9,711 || 68-80
|- align="center" bgcolor="bbffbb"
| 149 ||September 15 || @ Minnesota Twins || 12-7 || Abbott (2-0) || Rodriguez (4-6) || || 8,024 || 69-80
|- align="center" bgcolor="bbffbb"
| 150 ||September 16 || @ Oakland Athletics || 4-1 || Fassero (12-12) || Heredia (3-2) || Timlin (16) || 12,371 || 70-80
|- align="center" bgcolor="bbffbb"
| 151 ||September 17 || @ Oakland Athletics || 8-0 || Moyer (14-9) || Candiotti (11-16) || || 11,707 || 71-80
|- align="center" bgcolor="bbffbb"
| 152 ||September 18 || @ Anaheim Angels || 5-3 || Timlin (3-3) || DeLucia (2-6) || || 39,902 || 72-80
|- align="center"
| 153 ||September 19 || @ Anaheim Angels || 3-5 || McDowell (5-3) || Spoljaric (4-5) || Percival (41) || 42,833 || 72-81
|- align="center"
| 154 ||September 20 || @ Anaheim Angels || 1-3 || Olivares (9-8) || Abbott (2-1) || Percival (42) || 42,972 || 72-82
|- align="center" bgcolor="bbffbb"
| 155 ||September 21 || Oakland Athletics || 5-2 || Paniagua (2-0) || Heredia (3-3) || Timlin (17) || 30,076 || 73-82
|- align="center" bgcolor="bbffbb"
| 156 ||September 22 || Oakland Athletics || 7-6 || Moyer (15-9) || Witasick (1-2) || Timlin (18) || 20,908 || 74-82
|- align="center"
| 157 ||September 23 || Oakland Athletics || 3-8 || Mathews (6-4) || Slocumb (2-5) || Taylor (33) || 21,182 || 74-83
|- align="center"
| 158 ||September 24 || Texas Rangers || 3-9 || Sele (19-11) || Suzuki (1-2) || || 22,891 || 74-84
|- align="center" bgcolor="bbffbb"
| 159 ||September 25 || Texas Rangers || 15-4 || Abbott (3-1) || Loaiza (9-11) || || 39,325 || 75-84
|- align="center" bgcolor="bbffbb"
| 160 ||September 26 || Texas Rangers || 5-2 || Fassero (13-12) || Gunderson (0-3) || Timlin (19) || 33,147 || 76-84
|- align="center"
| 161 ||September 27 || Texas Rangers || 6-12 || Fossas (1-3) || Spoljaric (4-6) || || 37,986 ||76-85
|-

Player stats

Batting

Starters by position
Note: Pos = Position; G = Games played; AB = At bats; R = Runs; H = Hits; HR = Home runs; RBI = Runs batted in; Avg. = Batting average; Slg. = Slugging average; SB = Stolen bases

Other batters
Note: G = Games played; AB = At bats; R = Runs; H = Hits; HR = Home runs; RBI = Runs batted in; Avg. = Batting average; Slg. = Slugging average; SB = Stolen bases

Starting pitchers
Note: G = Games pitched; IP = Innings pitched; W = Wins; L = Losses; ERA = Earned run average; SO = Strikeouts; BB = Walks allowed

Other pitchers
Note: G = Games pitched; IP = Innings pitched; W = Wins; L = Losses; ERA = Earned run average; SO = Strikeouts; BB = Walks allowed

Relief pitchers
Note: G = Games pitched; IP = Innings pitched; W = Wins; L = Losses; SV = Saves; ERA = Earned run average; SO = Strikeouts; BB = Walks allowed

Ken Griffey Jr.'s 56 home runs

Awards and honors
Ken Griffey Jr., franchise record, most home runs in one season (56)
Alex Rodriguez, third member to join the 40/40 Club

Farm system

References

External links
1998 Seattle Mariners at Baseball Reference
1998 Seattle Mariners team page at www.baseball-almanac.com

Seattle Mariners seasons
Seattle Mariners
Seattle Marin